Rodney Scott Webb (June 21, 1935 – August 9, 2009) was a United States district judge of the United States District Court for the District of North Dakota.

Education and career

Born in Cavalier, North Dakota, Webb received a Bachelor of Science degree from the University of North Dakota in 1957. He received a Juris Doctor from University of North Dakota School of Law in 1959. He was in private practice of law in Grafton, North Dakota from 1959 to 1981. He was a Walsh County state attorney from 1967 to 1974. He was a special assistant attorney general for North Dakota from 1970 to 1981. He was a Grafton municipal judge from 1975 to 1981. He was the United States Attorney for the District of North Dakota from 1981 to 1987. Webb was a member of the United States Attorney General’s Advisory Committee of United States Attorneys and member of the Indian Affairs Subcommittee. He retired from the North Dakota Army National Guard J.A.G. Corps with the rank of colonel.

Federal judicial service

Webb was nominated by President Ronald Reagan on May 5, 1987, to a seat on the United States District Court for the District of North Dakota vacated by Judge Paul Benson. He was confirmed by the United States Senate on December 19, 1987, and received his commission on December 21, 1987. He served as Chief Judge from 1993 to 2001. He assumed senior status on December 31, 2001, serving in that status until his death.

Family

His son, Wade, is a state district judge in Fargo, North Dakota. Wade Webb was sworn into office by his father in 2003.

Death

Webb died in Fargo on Sunday, August 9, 2009, aged 74, from complications of cancer.

References

Sources
 

1935 births
2009 deaths
Deaths from cancer in North Dakota
Judges of the United States District Court for the District of North Dakota
Municipal judges in the United States
Lawyers from Fargo, North Dakota
People from Pembina County, North Dakota
People from Walsh County, North Dakota
State attorneys
United States district court judges appointed by Ronald Reagan
20th-century American judges
University of North Dakota alumni
United States Army officers
United States Attorneys for the District of North Dakota